Pedicularis oxycarpa is a species of flowering plant in the family Orobanchaceae. It is native to Yunnan and Sichuan, southwest China,  where it grows in 2800–4400 m alpine meadows.20–40 cm tall. Corolla white, with purplish beak, 1.4-1.8 cm.

References

oxycarpa
Flora of Sichuan
Flora of Yunnan